Welkin Mill, Lower Bredbury is a cotton spinning mill in Lower Bredbury/Portwood, Stockport, Greater Manchester. It was built in the early years of the 20th century for ring spinning. It was taken over by the Lancashire Cotton Corporation in the 1930s and passed to Courtaulds in 1964. Production ended in 1967. The , four-storey mill occupies a  site on Welkin Road.

Location

History
This stretch of the Goyt, shares much of it history with Stockport whose textile tradition started with the silk industry in the late 17th century. By the 18th century the manufacture of silk was dominating the economic life of the town. Large silk mills, such as Carrs Mill, Park Mill and Adlington Square Mill, became the major employers of the town. By 1769 nearly 2,000 people were employed in the town's silk trade. In 1772 the silk industry was in depression and the town turned to cotton. Stockport was very late in embracing the joint stock limited liability company boom. The first mill to be financed by that method was Vernon Mill.

Welkin was a ring mill built in the early 20th century producing 40's to 50's.

The industry peaked in 1912 when it produced 8 billion yards of cloth. The Great War of 1914–18 halted the supply of raw cotton, and the British government encouraged its colonies to build mills to spin and weave cotton. The war over, Lancashire never regained its markets. The independent mills were struggling. The Bank of England set up the Lancashire Cotton Corporation in 1929 to attempt to rationalise and save the industry. Welkin Mill, Lower Bredbury was one of 104 mills bought by the LCC, and one of the 53 mills that survived through to 1950. Ring mill producing 40's to 50's. Housing Buckleys printers (originally called Buckley & Bland), until the firm collapsed in October 2008. It was sold on the 12 March 2009 to the Sterling Property Company for £700,000.  It will be marketed, either as a whole or sub-divided, for commercial storage and warehousing rental market.

Usage

Owners

Lancashire Cotton Corporation (1930s–1964)
Courtaulds (1964–1967)
Buckley and Bland Printers (1967–2002) (Name changed to Buckleys in 1989)
Tipographic Printers (2002-2009)
Sterling Property Company (2009– 2016)
K2RE Limited (2016-

Tenants
 2010-2014 Printer Trader Limited let floors 1/2/32010-2012 UPS Warehouse
 K2RE LTD ( 03/2015)- Property Developer.
 moviESCAPE - Movie themed escape rooms (2016-)

See also

Textile manufacturing
List of mills in Stockport
Listed buildings in Bredbury and Romiley
Cotton Mill

References

Bibliography

External links
 Cottontown.org website
 Spinningtheweb.org website

Textile mills in the Metropolitan Borough of Stockport
Former textile mills in the United Kingdom
Textile mills owned by the Lancashire Cotton Corporation